Cecilia Salvai (born 2 December 1993) is an Italian professional footballer who plays as a centre back for Serie A club Juventus FC and the Italy women's national team. She has represented Italy U19 at the 2011 UEFA Women's Under-19 Championship.

Early life 
Salvai contracted and was treated for Hodgkin lymphoma at age four.

Club career
Salvai started her professional career with Canavese in 2008, and after a single season she moved to Torino, where she developed into a regular for the Turinese club. The team's website described her as "without doubt, the player with most appeal in Torino's roster." She plays primarily as a left-back, but she can move to become a centre-back when needed.

Before the start of the 2012–13 season, she moved to Swiss club Rapid Lugano, and left at the end of the season to return to Italy, as she signed with Veronese club Bardolino Verona.
On 11 July 2016, ahead of the 2016–17 season, she joined ACF Brescia Femminile. She joined Juventus starting in the 2017–18 season.

In August 2021, the Juventus Twitter account posted an image of Salvai using her fingers to pull back her eyes while wearing a training cone on her head, proving her racism towards Asians. The tweet was soon deleted, and the club apologized.

International career

Under-19
During the 2011 Championship Salvai was named on the starting XI of the opening group stage match against Russia. She did no play in the second group stage match against Switzerland, but she scored the equalizer against Belgium in an eventual 3–1 win for the azzurre. Italy reached the semi-finals unbeaten, but eventually lost 2–3 to Norway.

She was also called for the first qualifying round for the 2012 Championship, and she started all three matches as Italy advanced to the second qualifying round, where, again, she was a regular and started all three matches. Italy, however, finished second in its group and last amongst the runners-up, and therefore did not advance to the final tournament.

Under-20
Salvai was called by Italy's U-20 coach Corrado Corradini to take part in the 2012 World Cup, where she was a starter in all three group stage matches. As Italy finished last in Group B, they did not play any other match.

Senior
Salvai made her début for the senior team on 19 September 2012, as Italy faced Greece in the final qualification match before UEFA Women's Euro 2013. She started the first two group stage matches against Finland and Denmark but did not play against Sweden, as Italy advanced to the quarter-finals.

International goals

Honours
Juventus
 Serie A: 2017–18, 2018–19, 2019–20, 2020–21, 2021–22
 Coppa Italia: 2018–19, 
 Supercoppa Italiana: 2019, 2020–21, 2021–22

Individual
 AIC Best Women's XI: 2019

References

External links

 
 

1993 births
Living people
Italian women's footballers
Italy women's international footballers
Italian expatriate sportspeople in Switzerland
Expatriate women's footballers in Switzerland
Serie A (women's football) players
A.S.D. AGSM Verona F.C. players
A.C.F. Brescia Calcio Femminile players
People from Pinerolo
Women's association football defenders
Juventus F.C. (women) players
Torino Women A.S.D. players
Footballers from Piedmont
Sportspeople from the Metropolitan City of Turin
FF Lugano 1976 players
UEFA Women's Euro 2017 players